WELK (94.7 FM) is a classic hits formatted broadcast radio station licensed to Elkins, West Virginia, serving North Central West Virginia.  WELK is owned and operated by West Virginia Radio Corporation.

References

External links
94.7 WELK Online

1982 establishments in West Virginia
Classic hits radio stations in the United States
Radio stations established in 1982
ELK